Mammiyur Mahadeva Temple is a popular Shiva temple situated in Guruvayoor, Thrissur district of Kerala, India. Every devotee who goes to Guruvayur Temple is supposed to go to Mammiyoor also, as the ritual goes. Only Hindus are allowed inside the temple premises. The temple is a part of the 108 famous Shiva temples in Kerala and one among the five Shiva temples around Guruvayoor. The main deity is Lord Shiva, who is installed in the concept of 'Uma Maheshwara' - His form with Goddess Parvathi on his left. There is a shrine for Lord Vishnu also here. The sub-deities are Lord Ganapathi, Lord Subrahmanya, Lord Ayyappan, Goddess Kali and Serpent deities. This temple is managed by Malabar Devaswom Board. Daily three poojas are conducted. Puzhakkara Chennas Mana is the hereditary Thanthri of this temple too. Shivaratri and Ashtami Rohini are the major festivals.

Temple dress code
Men: Traditional Mundu Allowed (Lungi, Shirt and Banian Not allowed inside Sanctum Sanctorum).
Women: Salwar Kameez Allowed, Saree, Set Mundu, Skirts and Blouse allowed

References

Hindu temples in Thrissur district
Shiva temples in Kerala
Guruvayur
108 Shiva Temples